The Yixing Open was a pro–am minor-ranking snooker tournament which is part of the Players Tour Championship. The tournament started in 2013 and was staged at the Yixing Sports Centre in Yixing, China. Ding Junhui was the last champion.

Winners

See also
 Asian Players Tour Championship 2012/2013 – Event 2

References

 
Recurring sporting events established in 2013
2013 establishments in China
Yixing
Players Tour Championship
Snooker minor-ranking tournaments
Snooker competitions in China
Defunct snooker competitions
Recurring events disestablished in 2014
2014 disestablishments in China